{{DISPLAYTITLE:12e Régiment blindé du Canada}}

The 12e Régiment blindé du Canada (a translation of its former name, the "12th Canadian Armoured Regiment") is a Canadian Army armoured regiment based in CFB Valcartier, on the outskirts of Quebec City.  The regiment has both a Regular Force and a Primary Reserve unit. The 12e Régiment blindé du Canada's abbreviation is 12e RBC.

In the Regular Force regiment, all three Squadrons are based on the LAV family of vehicles and are designated as light armoured cavalry squadrons. Each squadron is currently organized into troops of four vehicles each. C Squadron, 12e RBC is located at CFB Gagetown as part of C Squadron, the Royal Canadian Dragoons.

Lineage

12e Régiment blindé du Canada
Originated 24 March 1871 in Trois-Rivières, Quebec as the Three Rivers Provisional Battalion of Infantry
Redesignated 4 June 1880 as the 86th "Three Rivers" Battalion of Infantry
Redesignated 8 May 1900 as the 86th Three Rivers Regiment
Redesignated 29 March 1920 as The Three Rivers Regiment
Converted 15 December 1936 to armour and redesignated as The Three Rivers Regiment (Tank)
Redesignated 13 August 1940 as the 2nd Regiment, The Three Rivers Regiment (Tank)
Redesignated 1 April 1941 as the 12th (Reserve) Army Tank Battalion, (The Three Rivers Regiment (Tank))
Redesignated 15 August 1942 as the 12th (Reserve) Army Tank Regiment (The Three Rivers Regiment (Tank))
Converted 1 April 1946 to artillery and redesignated as the 46th Anti-Tank Regiment, RCA (Three Rivers Regiment)
Converted 19 June 1947 to armour and redesignated the 24th Armoured Regiment (Three Rivers Regiment)
Redesignated 4 February 1949 as Le Régiment de Trois-Rivières (24th Armoured Regiment)
Redesignated 19 May 1958 as Le Régiment de Trois-Rivières (RCAC)
Redesignated 2 May 1968 as the 12e Régiment blindé du Canada

Lineage chart

Perpetuations

War of 1812
8th Battalion, Select Embodied Militia
Trois-Rivières Division

Great War
178th Battalion (Canadien-Français), CEF
259th Battalion, Canadian Rifles, CEF (Siberia)

Operational history

Great War
The 178th Battalion (Canadien-Français), CEF was authorized on 15 July 1916 and embarked for Britain on 3 March 1917, where, on 16 March 1917, its personnel were absorbed by the 10th Reserve Battalion, CEF to provide reinforcements for the Canadian Corps in the field. The battalion disbanded on 21 May 1917.

The 259th Battalion, Canadian Rifles, CEF (Siberia) was authorized on 1 November 1918 and embarked for Russia on 22 and 26 December 1918. There, it served with the 16th Infantry Brigade as part of the Allied Forces in eastern Russia until 19 May 1919. The battalion disbanded on 6 November 1920.

Second World War

The regiment mobilized  as The Three Rivers Regiment (Tank), CASF, for active service on 1 September 1939. It was redesignated as The Three Rivers Regiment (Tank), CAC, CASF, on 13 August 1940. It was converted to armour on 23 November 1940, and to an army tank battalion on 11 February 1941, designated as the 12th Army Tank Battalion (The Three Rivers Regiment (Tank)), CAC, CASF. It was redesignated as the 12th Army Tank Regiment (Three Rivers Regiment (Tank)), CAC, CASF, on 15 May 1942; as the 12th Armoured Regiment (Three Rivers Regiment), CAC, CASF, on 26 August 1943; and as the 12th Armoured Regiment (Three Rivers Regiment), RCAC, CASF on 2 August 1945.

On 21 June 1941 it embarked for Britain. The regiment landed in Sicily on 10 July 1943 and in Italy on 12 September 1943 as part of the 1st Canadian Armoured Brigade. On 8 March 1945 the regiment moved with the I Canadian Corps to North-West Europe as part of Operation Goldflake. There it fought until the end of the war. The overseas regiment disbanded on 30 November 1945.

Post-war
The Regular Force regiment served on peacekeeping duty in CYPRUS as part of OPERATION SNOWGOOSE from August 1990 to March 1991.

Afghanistan
The Regular regiment provided several reconnaissance squadrons and troops and tank crews to the Canadian Task Forces that served in Afghanistan from 2002 to 2014.

History

Its origins are in The Three Rivers Regiment, a militia (Reserve Force) regiment based in Trois-Rivières, a town halfway between Montreal and Quebec City. It originally formed in 1871 as the Three Rivers Provisional Battalion of Infantry. This was a new battalion headquarters that united four previously independent infantry companies that had been formed in 1869 at Trois-Rivières, Rivière-du-Loup-en-Haut, Berthier-en-Haut and Saint-Gabriel-de-Brandon. The battalion was given a number in 1880 (86th "Three Rivers" Battalion of Infantry) and raised to regiment status in 1900 (86th Three Rivers Regiment).

In the First World War, the Canadian militia infantry units were not mobilized, but instead new units were formed from volunteers from the militia and new recruits. The militia units generally became organizations for recruiting, induction and preliminary training. The 86th Regiment recruited the 178th "Overseas" Battalion, CEF, in 1916. The 178th Battalion was broken up in England in 1917, but enough of its former members fought at the Battle of Amiens (1918) that the battalion qualified for a battle honour, which the 12e RBC perpetuates.

The regiment also perpetuates the 259th Battalion, Canadian Rifles, Canadian Expeditionary Force (Siberia).

In the post-war reorganization of the Militia, the 86th Regiment lost its number, becoming simply The Three Rivers Regiment. In the 1936 reorganization, it became an infantry tank unit, The Three Rivers Regiment (Tank).

In the Second World War, the regiment mobilized an armoured regiment, which sailed to England in 1941. After two years of training, the 12th Armoured Regiment (Three Rivers Regiment) landed in Sicily, where it supported 1st Canadian Infantry Division throughout Operation Husky almost exclusively and gained a reputation for tenacity and courage. The 12th CAR was the first Canadian armoured regiment to destroy panzers in battle; a Panzer III and one of the Mark IV "Specials" were destroyed by its men at Grammichele on July 15. The regiment also took part Operation Baytown, landings on the Italian mainland in September 1943, as well and were often called upon to support British infantry battalions based on their quiet professionalism. Though the formation it was part of was originally known as 1st Tank Brigade, the name was changed to 1st Canadian Armoured Brigade later on.

After the war, the regiment was given a (partially) French name: Le Régiment de Trois-Rivières (24th Armoured Regiment).

In 1968 the regiment was renamed and expanded to include a new Regular Force regiment in addition to the original Militia regiment. The Regular Force unit is called 12e Régiment blindé du Canada, and the Militia unit is named 12e Régiment blindé du Canada (Militia) (or in French). The number in the regimental title commemorates the Second World War unit, 12th Armoured Regiment (Three Rivers Regiment).

Alliances 
 – Royal Tank Regiment
 – 2e Régiment de hussards
 - 3rd Light Armored Reconnaissance Battalion

Battle honours
In the list below, battle honours in capitals were awarded for participation in large operations and campaigns, while those in lowercase indicate honours granted for more specific battles. Those battle honours in bold type are emblazoned on the regimental guidon.

War of 1812
 Non-emblazonable honorary distinction

Great War

Second World War

War in Afghanistan
 
Notes:

Trois-Rivières Military Museum 

The museum collects, preserves, researches, interprets and exhibits artifacts which reflect the military history of Trois-Rivières, the 12th Armoured Regiment (Three Rivers Regiment) story and the history of the Canadian Militia. The museum serves as a training medium to teach regimental history, and to stimulate and foster within the general public an ongoing interest in the regiment, its activities and accomplishments. The Museum is affiliated with: CMA,  CHIN, OMMC and Virtual Museum of Canada.

Order of precedence

Regular Force
While the regiment is the oldest of the Regular Force armoured regiments, its Regular Force component takes its precedence from its date of entry into the Regular Force (1968). The Reserve Force component continues to take its precedence from 1871 within the Reserve Force.

Reserve Force

Notes and references

External links
Official site of the Reserve Regiment
 
 Regimental association 

Military units and formations established in 1968
Armoured regiments of Canada
1968 establishments in Quebec
Military units and formations of Quebec
Military units and formations of Canada in World War II
Former infantry regiments of Canada